Hou Yuxia (born 20 May 1979) is a Chinese biathlete. She competed in three events at the 2006 Winter Olympics. She also competed in the cross-country skiing at the 2002 Winter Olympics.

References

External links
 

1979 births
Living people
Biathletes at the 2006 Winter Olympics
Cross-country skiers at the 2002 Winter Olympics
Chinese female biathletes
Chinese female cross-country skiers
Olympic biathletes of China
Olympic cross-country skiers of China
Place of birth missing (living people)
Asian Games medalists in cross-country skiing
Cross-country skiers at the 2003 Asian Winter Games
Cross-country skiers at the 2007 Asian Winter Games
Medalists at the 2003 Asian Winter Games
Medalists at the 2007 Asian Winter Games
Asian Games silver medalists for China
Asian Games bronze medalists for China
People from Tonghua
Sport shooters from Jilin
Skiers from Jilin
21st-century Chinese women